Affair in Trinidad is a 1952 American film noir directed by Vincent Sherman and starring Rita Hayworth and Glenn Ford. It was produced by Hayworth's Beckworth Corporation and released by Columbia Pictures.

It is notable as Hayworth's "comeback" film after four years away from Columbia, as a reteaming of the stars of Gilda (1946) and for a fiery opening number in which Hayworth dances barefoot to calypso music.  Hayworth's singing voice is dubbed by Jo Ann Greer, who later also sang for her in Miss Sadie Thompson and Pal Joey. The film's gross take at the box office exceeded Gilda'''s by $1 million.

Plot
Chris Emery works as a nightclub singer and dancer in the British colony of Trinidad and Tobago. One night after her performance she receives news from Inspector Smythe and Anderson, a member of the American consulate, that her husband Neil has been found dead. She is comforted by Neil's friend Max Fabian.

Initially, the police conclude that Neil committed suicide based on his gunshot wound and the discovery of a pistol at the crime scene, but on further investigation, they believe that he was murdered. Smythe and Anderson take Chris into confidence and inform her that Neil's boat was seen outside Fabian's property at the time of Neil's murder. Chris learns that Fabian is a crook who has built his fortune by trading information and aiding in treason and that Neil could have been murdered because of his involvement in Fabian's latest project to allow Nazis launch rockets from Trinidad to attack the United States. Chris agrees to exploit Fabian's love for her to gather information for the police.

Neil's brother Steve Emery arrives in Trinidad at the request of his late brother, who had written to him about a prospective job. Steve is shocked to learn that Neil committed suicide shortly after writing to him and sets out to investigate matters on his own. After the inquest, Chris and Steve spend time together and she begins to fall in love with him, but she cannot reveal her motive behind getting friendly with Fabian.

At a party a Fabian's estate, Steve recognizes Walters as a man who sat next to him on his flight to Trinidad and became agitated at the mention of his brother's name. Since Walters' portion of research has been completed, Fabian judges him a liability and has him killed by a hit-and-run driver. This increases the authorities' suspicion of him.

As Chris inches closer to discovering the truth about Fabian, Steve gathers proof of Fabian's involvement in Neil's death, leading to a climactic showdown. During the struggle for a gun, Fabian is accidentally shot in the stomach. Sensing his wound might prove fatal, he orders his accomplices to take the secrets and leave him behind. But local authorities have surrounded the estate and they are either killed or captured. Steve finishes Fabian off in a climactic gunfight; and with Chris cleared, they leave for Chicago.

Cast

Reception
In a contemporary review for The New York Times'', critic Bosley Crowther panned the film as "as apparent and monotonous as a phonograph record on which the needle is stuck before it has traveled half the distance of the hour and forty minutes that it runs." Crowther was especially critical of Hayworth's performance: "[T]he demurely returning Miss Hayworth proves no bargain after an absence of four years. In that time, we had probably forgotten what a mediocre actress she is, and now the bald fact—politely winked at in the past—hits one right between the eyes. Tawny she is and sometimes handsome in a highly shellacked and tailored way, but her acting is vastly unexpressive of anything but the postures of a doll. And the dancing she does in this picture makes her look both vulgar and grotesque."

The film earned an estimated $2.7 million at the North American box office in 1952.

Music
 "I've Been Kissed Before" - written by Lester Lee and Bob Russell; performed by Rita Hayworth (dubbed by Jo Ann Greer).
 "Trinidad Lady" - written by Lester Lee and Bob Russell; performed by Rita Hayworth (dubbed by Jo Ann Greer).

References

External links
 
 
 
 
 
 

1952 films
1952 drama films
1950s spy drama films
American black-and-white films
American spy drama films
Columbia Pictures films
Film noir
Films about singers
Films directed by Vincent Sherman
Films set in Trinidad and Tobago
1950s English-language films
1950s American films